Zindasht (also Romanized as Zīndasht) is a village in Kenarporuzh Rural District, in the Central District of Salmas County, West Azerbaijan Province, Iran. At the 2006 census, its population was 910, in 157 families.

References 

Populated places in Salmas County